The University of Wisconsin–Stout (UW–Stout or Stout) is a public university in Menomonie, Wisconsin. A member of the University of Wisconsin System, it enrolls more than 9,600 students. The school was founded in 1891 and named in honor of its founder, lumber magnate James Huff Stout.

Stout is "Wisconsin's Polytechnic University". It is one of two special mission universities in the University of Wisconsin System and provides focused programs "related to professional careers in industry, technology, home economics, applied art, and the helping professions." UW–Stout offers 49 undergraduate majors and 22 graduate majors, including 2 advanced graduate majors and a doctorate.

History

In 1891, James Huff Stout, a Wisconsin State Senator and Menomonie resident, founded a manual training school, the first of several educational enterprises he launched in Menomonie. The Manual Training movement was an educational philosophy that influenced modern vocational education. In the United States, this philosophy was established in the 1870s and used to train engineers, later working its way into public education. Manual training promoted a classical liberal education, but emphasizing practical application such as practical judgment, perception and visual accuracy, and manual dexterity over theory. It was not meant to be used to teach specific trades, but rather to enhance the traditional educational model. Students learned drafting, mechanics, woodworking, metal working, in addition to science, mathematics, language, literature, and history. After the American Civil War, leaders of industry and politics were turning to public education to augment existing apprenticeship programs by incorporating Manual Training philosophy into their curricula.

Stout was influenced by the Arts and Crafts Movement, the philosophies of which influenced his own philosophy of education, specifically that making things by hand, through skill and creativity, would provide more thoughtful and creative consumer goods because of the personal satisfaction of the craftsperson. The American interpretation of the Arts and Crafts movement was not in opposition to modern industry. Rather, it embraced creativity and intellectual development as necessary components of the educational model, leading the school to teach classes in drawing, jewelry making, embroidery, and photography.

In addition to the Stout Manual Training School, James Huff Stout established kindergarten classes (1894), a Kindergarten Training School (1899), a School of Physical Culture (1901), training schools for manual training teachers and domestic science teachers (1903), and a Homemaker's School (1907). In 1908, to simplify and clarify administration, Stout merged the various institutions owned by him into the Stout Institute, which was sold to the state of Wisconsin after Stout's death in 1911. The school was governed by its own board of regents until 1955, when it became part of the Wisconsin State Colleges system as Stout State College. The state colleges were all upgraded to university status in 1965, and accordingly Stout State College became Stout State University. In 1971, after the merger of the former University of Wisconsin and the Wisconsin State Universities, the school became part of the University of Wisconsin System and has been named University of Wisconsin–Stout since then. In March 2007, UW-Stout was designated "Wisconsin's Polytechnic University" by the UW System Board of Regents.

Academics
UW–Stout offers 49 undergraduate majors, 22 graduate majors, and 60 minors. The Graduate School provides oversight for graduate education at the university. UW–Stout offers three terminal degree programs; the Master of Fine Arts in Design, the Educational Specialist degree in both School Psychology and Career and Technical Education, and the Doctor of Education in Career and Technical Education.

Colleges and schools 
UW-Stout is organized into two colleges: the College of Arts and Human Sciences, which houses the School of Art and Design and the School of Education; and the College of Science, Technology, Engineering, Mathematics and Management, which houses the Robert F. Cervenka School of Engineering, the School of Hospitality Leadership, and the School of Management.

The Graduate School provides oversight for graduate education at the university.

English as a Second Language Institute
The English as a Second Language Institute offers year-round English immersion courses to non-native English speakers.

Campus

UW–Stout is made up of two parts, a main campus and north campus. The main campus has most classrooms, five of nine residence halls, and three dining facilities, while the north campus is the remaining four residence halls, along with one dining hall and the student health facilities.

Buildings and facilities
Student Health Center
Louis Smith Tainter House
Harvey Hall
Bowman Hall
Sorensen Hall
Heritage Hall (formerly Home Economics Building)
Fryklund Hall
Communication Technologies Building
Millennium Hall
Vocational Rehabilitation Building
Robert S. Swanson Library and Learning Center
Memorial Student Center
Administration Building
General Services Building
Merle M. Price Commons
Jarvis Hall (Technology Wing, Science Wing and Science Wing Addition)
Micheels Hall
Applied Arts Building
Johnson Fieldhouse
Sports and Fitness Center
Adventure Challenge Course
Alumni Field
Heating Plant
Don and Nona Williams Stadium
Burton E. Nelson Field
North Point Dining and Fitness Center
Child and Family Study Center
North Hall
South Hall
HKMC (Hansen-Keith-Milnes-Chinnock Halls)
CKTO (Curran-Kranzusch-Tustison-Oetting Halls)
AFM (Antrim-Froggatt-McCalmont Halls)
Fleming-Hovlid Hall
Red Cedar Hall
Wigen Hall
JTC (Jeter-Tainter-Callahan Halls)

Residence halls
More than 3,000 students live on campus. All freshmen and sophomores are required to live on campus for their first two academic years. Housing includes traditional dorms and modern suite-styled rooms. There are nine residence halls. All are co-ed.

 AFM (Antrim-Froggatt-McCalmont Halls)
 CKTO (Curran-Kranzusch-Tustison-Oetting Halls)
 Fleming-Hovlid Hall
 HKMC (Hansen-Keith-Milnes-Chinnock Halls)
 JTC (Jeter-Tainter-Callahan Halls)
 North Hall
 Red Cedar Hall
 South Hall
 Wigen Hall

Stout Student Association 
The Stout Student Association is the Student Government representing all students at UW-Stout.

Research 
The university was designated Wisconsin's polytechnic university by the UW System Board of Regents in the spring of 2007. In 2013, officials from MIT helped open a fab lab on the UW-Stout campus, the only university in Wisconsin with such a facility.

Research centers and programs
 
Applied Research Center
Archives and Area Research Center
Assistive Technology and Assessment Center
Center for Applied Ethics
Center for Nutrition Education
Child and Family Study Center
Discovery Center (home to the UW-Stout Fab Lab)
Nakatani Center for Learning Technologies
UW-Stout Manufacturing Outreach Center
People Process Culture
Risk Control Center
Stout Vocational Rehabilitation Institute

Stout Technology and Business Park
Just east of the main campus lies the Stout Technology and Research Park, an area housing facilities and laboratories dedicated to research, high technology, engineering, product development and prototype manufacturing, product testing, experimental and commercial testing, and light manufacturing. Business and industry entities located in the STBP include facilities owned by 3M, Andersen Corporation, and ConAgra Foods.

Athletics 

UW–Stout's athletic varsity teams mascot is the Blue Devils and the school colors are navy blue and white. The school competes in the WIAC in NCAA Division III. The women's gymnastics team is affiliated with NCGA (National Collegiate Gymnastics Association).

As a DIII university, student athletes compete without the benefit of athletics aid or scholarships. Men's teams include: football, baseball, basketball, cross country, golf, ice hockey and track and field. Women's teams include: basketball, cross country, golf, gymnastics, soccer, softball, tennis, track and field, and volleyball.

Notable alumni

Tony Beckham, former NFL player
Vera C. Bushfield, former U.S. senator from South Dakota
Alice Clausing, former Wisconsin State Senator
Rikard Grönborg, ice hockey coach
Oties Epps, head coach of the University of Evansville women's basketball team
Harvey M. Haakenson, U.S. National Guard general
Frank Haege, college and professional football coach
Jeff Hazuga, former NFL player
Karen Heagle, American Artist
Hubert C. Hegtvedt, U.S. Air Force general
Luke Helder, Midwest pipe bomber
Gus Johnson, YouTube personality and comedian
Emil C. Kiel, U.S. Air Force general
Robert J. Larson, former Wisconsin State Representative
Scott D. Legwold, U.S. National Guard general
Bob McRoberts, former NFL player
Cindy Pawlcyn, James Beard Foundation award recipient for Best American cookbook
John Peterson, Olympic gold medalist
Bob Raczek, hall-of-fame high school football coach
Ewald J. Schmeichel, former Wisconsin State Representative
Tony Storti, former head coach of the Montana State Bobcats football team
Joe Vavra, quality control coach for the Detroit Tigers
Eliza Wheeler, children's book illustrator
Nancy Zieman of Sewing with Nancy
David Zien, former Wisconsin state senator

References

External links

 

 
University of Wisconsin-Stout
Stout
Educational institutions established in 1891
Buildings and structures in Dunn County, Wisconsin
Education in Dunn County, Wisconsin
Tourist attractions in Dunn County, Wisconsin
1891 establishments in Wisconsin